The USB video device class (also USB video class or UVC) is a USB device class that describes devices capable of streaming video like webcams, digital camcorders, transcoders, analog video converters and still-image cameras.

The latest revision of the USB video class specification carries the version number 1.5 and was defined by the USB Implementers Forum in a set of documents describing both the basic protocol and the different payload formats.

Devices

Webcams
Webcams were among the first devices to support the UVC standard and are currently the most popular UVC devices.

TV receivers and video recorders

UVC v1.5 supports transmission of compressed video streams, including MPEG-2 TS, H.264, MPEG-4 SL SMPTE VC1 and MJPEG.

Formats
 Uncompressed YUV formats YUY2, NV12
 DV formats SD-DV, SDL-DV, and HD-DV (525-60, 625-50, 1125–60, 1250-50)
 Frame-based
 Video stream formats like MPEG-2 TS, H.264, MPEG-4 SL, SMPTE VC1, VP8 and MJPEG

Revision history

For detailed history on releases, see the revision history section of the published USB UVC documents, available from the USB.org page.

Operating system support 

 AndroidAs of the release of Android 10 (and still as of June 2020) Android does not support UVC (USB video devices). Earlier Android versions do support UVC.
 LinuxUSB video class support for Linux is provided by the Linux UVC driver, although as of July 2017 support for still-image capture is not yet implemented. The UVC driver has been included in the Linux kernel source code since kernel version 2.6.26. Detection of UVC 1.5 devices was introduced in Linux kernel version 4.5, but support in the driver for UVC 1.5 specific features or specific UVC 1.5 devices was not added and MPEG-2 TS, H.264 and VP8 payloads are not supported yet. The result is that some UVC 1.5 devices that also support UVC 1.1 work correctly.
 macOS macOS ships with a UVC driver included since version 10.4.3, updated in 10.4.9 to work with iChat.
 Windows Windows XP has a class driver for USB video class 1.0 devices since Service Pack 2, as does Windows Vista and Windows CE 6.0. A post-service pack 2 update that adds more capabilities is also available. Windows 7 added UVC 1.1 support. Support for UVC 1.5 is currently only available in Windows 8, 10 and 11. Most device manufacturers do, however, provide their own drivers tailored to the capabilities of the product in question.:

 FreeBSDFreeBSD added the uvc driver for UVC devices in Jan 18, 2011; added in the 9.0 release.
 NetBSDNetBSD added the uvideo driver for UVC devices in September 2008; added in the 5.0 release.
 OpenBSDOpenBSD added the uvideo driver for UVC devices in April 2008; it appears in the 4.4 release.
 PlayStation 3The PlayStation 3 added support for UVC compatible webcams in firmware version 1.54 (only works for video chat, not games.)
 MenuetOSMenuetOS added support for UVC compatible webcams in version 0.87
 SolarisSolaris includes support for UVC webcams in the form of the usbvc driver for OpenSolaris. The driver ships with Solaris Express  and later.

References

USB
Videotelephony